Asli E. Perker (1975, İzmir) is a Turkish journalist and writer.

Biography 
Asli Perker was born in İzmir, Turkey in 1975.  She graduated from Dokuz Eylül University with a degree in American Literature and Culture. After her university education, she worked in weekly magazine Aktüel Haber Dergisi; Turkish daily newspapers Radikal, Yeni Binyıl, Sabah; and as a freelance reporter and journalist in New York City. After returning to Istanbul in 2010, she worked as a columnist in Turkish daily newspapers including Milliyet, as a blogger and columnist on several online publications, and is currently the chief editor of Turkish publishing house Beyaz Baykus Yayinlari.

Perker's novels:
Baskalarinin Kokusu (2005)
Cellat Mezarligi (2009)
Sufle (2011)
Bana Yardim Et (2015)
Vakit Hazan (2016)
Flamingolar Pembedir (2018)

Sufle has been translated into several languages and published in many countries including the U.S.A.

References

External links

1975 births
Living people
Turkish writers
Turkish journalists
Turkish women journalists